Muhammad Alif bin Abdul Hadi is a Malaysian actor and TV host. He is also known as Alif Hadi. He made his debut on the reality show Fear Factor Selebriti Malaysia, Soon after, he starred in local dramas and telemovies such as Banglo Seksyen 2, Anak Patung, Syurga tanpa Cinta, Duda Terlajak Laris, Samudera Rindu, Dia Semanis Honey, Sayangku Kapten Mukhriz, Red Velvet and Angkara Cinta.

Early life
Alif was born on 30 June 1988, in Kuala Lumpur, Malaysia. He is the second of two siblings. He lived in Kuang until 2002, then moved to Johor Bahru in 2003 before he then moved again to Shah Alam until the present day. He attended Sekolah Kebangsaan Kuang at primary level, then he continued his studies at Sri Bestari International School before he moved to Sekolah Menengah Kebangsaan Taman Perling 1. Upon finishing his secondary school, he then furthered his studies by taking PRE-Law course at KDU College which eventually continued his law path in taking the law degree LLB Hons. During his final year of his law degree, Alif then furthered his LLB (Hons) final year at the Oxford Brookes University, in Oxford, United Kingdom. Graduation from his LLB Law Degree, he began to realised that being a lawyer is not his cup of tea. He then continues furthering his studies by taking Master of Science in Economic Crime Management at the HELP University. Before debuting as an actor and TV Host, he was a part-time talent for TV Commercials and Printing Advertisements. He has been involved in advertising such as Brylcreem, Streamyx, Coca-Cola, Pizza Hut, Suzuki and many more.

Career

2006-present: skateboarding career
Apart from the entertainment career, Alif began his early career in sports as a professional skateboarder. He started skateboarding at the age of 14 in 2002. His development in skateboarding had flourished during his spell in the United Kingdom. Upon his return to Malaysia in 2010, he was sponsored by Ollie Cat Skateboards. After a few years winning several local competitions, in 2010, Alif was then sponsored by Hellbent Skateboarding and a year after that he was then sponsored by DC Shoes Malaysia. He was also at various times sponsored Crazeecausa, Lazca Skateshop and Glassy Sunhaters.

Achievements

2010-present: hosting and acting
In 2010, Alif had been offered to become a TV host for KRU TV under KRU Studios. His first baby project was a TV magazine titled 24-7 that was aired on Astro Ria and on Suria Media Corp. Singapore. In 2011, Alif was then offered to be the face of TVi RTM and also was chosen to become the host for Selamat Pagi Malaysia. In 2012, he participated in Fear Factor Selebriti Malaysia. During his participation on the reality show, controversy rises when Alif and his partner, Gambit Saifullah was deemed to be the villains on the show. Both of them was heavily criticised by the viewers after sparks a few tensions with other participants.

After Fear Factor Selebriti Malaysia, Alif began his acting career starring in his first drama Cornetto Kisah Chenta Uda dan Dara. He is still till this present day, active in acting and also hosting at the same time.

Filmography

Film

Television series

Telemovies

Television

Theatre

Commercial and advertisement

References

External links
 

21st-century Malaysian male actors
Malaysian television personalities
Malaysian male television actors
Living people
Malaysian male stage actors
Malaysian people of Malay descent
Malaysian Muslims
1988 births